Oussama Souaidy (born 25 August 1981) is a retired footballer who played mainly as a defensive midfielder. Born in France, he represented Morocco at international level.

Club career
Born in Cahors, France, Souaidy made two Ligue 1 appearances for FC Toulouse in the 2000–01 season, with the club being relegated straight to the Championnat National due to irregularities. After one further campaign he moved to Spain, where he would remain until his retirement nine years later (with the exception of 2005–06 which was spent in Portugal with G.D. Estoril Praia, in the second division).

In the former country, Souaidy never played in higher than Segunda División B, and spent his final five seasons in Tercera División. He represented SD Noja, RCD Mallorca B, UDA Gramenet, AD Fundación Logroñés, CD Mirandés, CD Alfaro and CD Tudelano, retiring in June 2011 at nearly 30 years of age.

International career
Souaidy won one cap for Morocco, in 2002. Additionally, he was part of the squad that appeared at the 2004 Summer Olympics in Athens, appearing in all the matches as the national team exited in the group stage with a total of four points.

References

External links
 
 
 
 
 

1981 births
Living people
People from Cahors
French sportspeople of Moroccan descent
Sportspeople from Lot (department)
Moroccan footballers
Association football midfielders
Association football utility players
Ligue 1 players
Toulouse FC players
Segunda División B players
Tercera División players
RCD Mallorca B players
UDA Gramenet footballers
CD Mirandés footballers
CD Tudelano footballers
Liga Portugal 2 players
G.D. Estoril Praia players
Morocco international footballers
Olympic footballers of Morocco
Footballers at the 2004 Summer Olympics
Moroccan expatriate footballers
Expatriate footballers in Spain
Expatriate footballers in Portugal
Moroccan expatriate sportspeople in Spain
Moroccan expatriate sportspeople in Portugal
Footballers from Occitania (administrative region)
French expatriate sportspeople in Spain
French footballers
French expatriate footballers
French expatriate sportspeople in Portugal